Everywhere, an Empty Bliss is the twelfth and final release by the Caretaker, an alias of English musician Leyland Kirby. Released on February 26, 2019, the record is compiled from archived tracks that were meant to be used on the Caretaker's albums. Before finishing his album series Everywhere at the End of Time, Kirby released the album as "a surprise golden farewell." It is the first album under the Caretaker alias to feature easily audible lyrical content since 2003's We'll All Go Riding on a Rainbow.

Most similar to the compositions of Stage 3, the album was promoted by a French art exhibition. Following the album's release, Kirby performed in 2019 and 2020 for promotion. He claimed the record would be free to download until June 2019, but , it was still available for free. Everywhere, an Empty Bliss met praise from music critics because of its content related to dementia.

Background
The Caretaker was an alias of English musician Leyland Kirby that manipulated big band songs. Inspired by the film The Shining (1980), the pseudonym's first releases were heavily influenced by the movie's haunted ballroom scene. However, Kirby later moved on to explore memory loss through Theoretically Pure Anterograde Amnesia (2005). Shifting record labels, Persistent Repetition of Phrases (2008) changed from V/Vm Test to History Always Favours the Winners. The album featured a change in concept from previous records; rather than amnesia, it depicts Alzheimer's disease. Along with the Caretaker's first releases, the album was mentioned by Fact as a "modern classic" of Kirby's music. The Caretaker broke through the ambient scene with An Empty Bliss Beyond This World (2011).

After five years without any releases, Kirby announced that he would be "giving the alias dementia" with an album series titled Everywhere at the End of Time (20162019). The series explored the disorder and attempted to replicate it through six stages, with Stage 1 consisting of ballroom music loops and Stage 6 consisting of white noise. It would later be misinterpreted by music publications, draw comparisons to the Brexit process, and inspire other musicians to create music influenced by experiences with patients. Alongside the final album of the series, Everywhere, an Empty Bliss was released, according to Kirby, as "a surprise golden farewell." He added that it is:

Composition
Mastered by musician Stephan Mathieu, Everywhere, an Empty Bliss combines the titles of Everywhere at the End of Time and An Empty Bliss Beyond This World. The record is compiled from tracks that were meant to be used on these albums. It presents a movie-like texture with nostalgic sounds of vinyl crackle. Like on Everywhere at the End of Time, the music gets more distorted as the album progresses, also reflecting dementia. However, this is done in miniature in contrast to the six-hour runtime of the album series. Like the series, the album also features a range of emotions, from joyful to hauntological.

The album is most similar to the compositions of Stage 3. On "Losing Battle of Loss", the melancholy settles in the album. This is contrasted by "All Eyes Bewildered", which features a music box song. "Losing Loss of Battle" repeats "Losing Battle of Loss", and by "Plaque Advanced Despair" the music struggles to have a coherent melody.

The record presents lyrical content within some of its tracks. On "Glimpses of Life Denial", a woman recites a Santa Claus song to a group of kids. "Benjamin Beyond Bliss" features a sample of a song by piano duo Layton & Johnstone that is manipulated so that only small parts of the voice are recognizable. It features garbled words, akin to a destroyed intercom. By "Dusk Memory Fraction", a man singing in French can be heard.

Artwork and release
The artwork was created by Kirby's long-time friend Ivan Seal. The arts of Seal and the music of Kirby were included on a French exhibition that occurred in 2019, done by the arts company FRAC Auvergne. Named after Everywhere, an Empty Bliss, it presented Kirby's music and names for the paintings used as the album covers. In the exhibition, a CD edition of Everywhere, an Empty Bliss and a booklet consisting of Seal's paintings were also present. The company released a YouTube promotional video announcing that their exhibition would happen from 6 April to 6 June 2019. Seal's art was also featured near one of Kirby's live performances in 2019, on an exhibition titled Cukuwruums. Searching for uncommon venues, a signature mark of the festival, the organizers found an abandoned apartment from 2014. Seal felt that "nothing should be cleared up—there would be no brushing up." First built as a part of the performance, the exhibition remained open later. The title of its artwork, Pm, Why Bees Are Very Silent (2019), is an anagram of the album's name. The record's CD edition presents a different part of the painting used as the album cover on the digital edition.

Kirby's last work as the Caretaker, Everywhere, an Empty Bliss was released on 14 March 2019, alongside Stage 6 of the album series. Kirby claimed the album would be available for free on his Bandcamp until 16 June of that year. However, as of May 2021, the record is still available for free. To promote the album and his album series, Kirby performed at two music festivals: the "Solidarity" show of the Unsound Festival in May 2019, and the "[Re]setting" Rewire Festival in 2020, which would occur in April at The Hague.

Critical reception
Everywhere, an Empty Bliss received general praise from music critics for its dementia-related topics. Hayden Menzies, drummer of band Metz, wrote for Bandcamp Daily that the album "is kind of terrifying for a lot of people and understandably so." He added that the record is "worth a listen, but don't be prepared to come out feeling very good after." Richard Allen of website A Closer Listen felt that, along with the album series, the release "offers dignity to those suffering from the disease, as well as encouragement to caregivers." He called them "a definitive statement".

Along with Everywhere at the End of Time, Everywhere, an Empty Bliss ranked fourth on A Closer Listens top releases of the 2010s listing.

Track listing
Digital and French CD listings adapted from Bandcamp and Boomkat respectively.

Personnel
Adapted from YouTube.
The Caretaker – "remembering and disfiguring" of the audio
Leyland Kirby – compilation
Ivan Seal – album covers
Stephan Mathieu – aural mastering

Release history

References

External links

Everywhere, an Empty Bliss on Bandcamp
Everywhere, an Empty Bliss on Boomkat

The Caretaker (musician) albums
2019 compilation albums